Henry Bowyer Joseph Lane (1817–1878) was an English architect who worked in Toronto from .

Lane was born to Henry Bower Lane, a Royal Artillery Captain and Elizabeth Lacey in 1817 and moved to Devon, England after 1819.

Lane's education included time at Blundell's School in Tiverton and subsequent professional training in England before he emigrated to Canada in 1841, living first in Cobourg, Upper Canada, and then in Toronto (around 1843–1844).

One of Lane's most significant contributions is Osgoode Hall, namely the west and central wings from 1844 to 1846. He designed and oversaw the construction of the incorporated city of Toronto's second city hall in 1844. Lane's limited commissions outside of Toronto, in Niagara-on-the-Lake and Cobourg, were never as grand as his work in Toronto.

During his time in Toronto, Lane married Lucy Anne Sharpe in 1844, and they left the city in 1847. 

He is known to have been in the Colony of Victoria, Australia thereafter. In the Ovens Directory for the year 1857, (State Library of New South Wales), he is listed as Henry Bowyer Lane Esq., Subwarden and Chinese Protector and Magistrate for the Yachandandah Creek Goldfield, near Bright.  He was still in the Victorian Alps in 1862, because his fine watercolour, The Buckland near the Camp, clearly signed and dated May 1862, is held by the State Library of Victoria (Australia). It shows the Buckland Hotel and the Buckland Post Office, and eight Chinese gold miners crossing the bridge over the Buckland River during the Australian gold rush. A European man (maybe the postmaster, William McKay) is sitting on the steps of the Post Office, chatting to a European woman. The Buckland River goldfield was near the present town of Bright in the Australian Alps.   

Lane is believed to have died in Birmingham, England in 1878.

Works

References

External links
 LANE, HENRY BOWYER JOSEPH at Dictionary of Canadian Biography Online

1817 births
1878 deaths
People educated at Blundell's School
People from Old Toronto
Pre-Confederation Ontario people
19th-century Canadian architects